was a Japanese variety show hosted by KAT-TUN, a Japanese boy band formed by Johnny & Associates. The show began airing on April 4, 2007, and ended on March 24, 2010. It aired every Wednesday from 11:55 pm to 12:26 am on NTV for 3 years. The theme song for the first season of the show was "Girlfriend" by Avril Lavigne, Shelter by Corrinne May for the second season and Come On Eileen by Dexy's Midnight Runners for the third season.

Season 1 Segments

100Q
This is the main segment of the show where the guest fills out a questionnaire with 100 questions before the show.  The questions and answers are displayed on a rotating ring in front of KAT-TUN and the guest during the show. When any of the members have an interest in any of the questions, they simply "touch" the ring and it momentarily stops so the guest can elaborate on their answer.  At the official website, under 100Q, all of the question and answers that the guest filled out are there.

Mini Stage
Mini Stage is where KAT-TUN performs their songs live. They usually do so when they recently released a single.

DAT-TUN5
It's a game of bingo-darts where they use a five by five square dart board. The first team with five darts in a row (in any direction) wins. If the guest wins, they receive a golden dart, but if KAT-TUN loses five times consecutively they receive a punishment game.

Half and Half
Guests must ask KAT-TUN a Yes or No question that splits the group in half in order to receive a delicious food prize. The guests have 3 chances but usually KAT-TUN is lenient and splits in half so the guest can receive their present.

Smile Athlete No.1 Decision Battle
This corner is the punishment game received when KAT-TUN loses five consecutive DAT-TUN5 games. They have to complete a series of athletic games while maintaining their smiles. Whoever stops smiling will be punished by the Tickling Guan Yin. When this happens, they are strapped to a board decorated to look like Guan Yin, and his multiple hands from behind the board mercilessly tickles them.

Dangerous Present Exchange
A corner where KAT-TUN and their guest pretend to be smuggling illegal goods, which are actually presents for each other. They come up with special code words, and the gifts are custom made (designed, produced) by KAT-TUN and their guest.

♥disk
♥disk is a part of the show where they invite various artists to come and talk about their favorite songs. They ask question such as "Do you have any songs in which the lyrics touch you?" and "Which artist influences you the most?".

Season 2

What is Love?
The show's format was completely revamped in June 2008 in favour of a six-month-long special in which each KAT-TUN member is given the task to find out the true definition of love by their own means. KAT-TUN is seen seemingly living in an underground bunker where they host guests on the show in each respective member's room. Most conversations revolve around the topics of love and relationships in lieu with the theme though new episodes have not strictly followed the format. A good majority of the new format have also seen KAT-TUN venturing out of the studio to do various activities with guests.

Season 3

Lessons of Life
KAT-TUN members get sent to various locations to learn different lessons of life. For the first time the show had a live audience in the studio which allowed them to connect with their fans and made for a livelier atmosphere. For the majority of the show they were split into two filming teams of three KAT-TUN members; Kamenashi, Tanaka, Ueda on one team and Akanishi, Taguchi, Nakamaru on the other. When the teams arrived at their destined location they would be surprised by guests (usually comedians) to join them on their trip. Each team rotated creating film for the show and a lot of times each trip would span two episodes. Film is watched in the studio with all six members and at the very end of the show an "Omiyage" or souvenir is brought back to the studio for the rest of the members to enjoy.

Episodes

Season 1

Season 2
In search of "What is Love?"

Season 3
mission... members of KAT-TUN learn various things.

External links
 Official Website
 Japanese Wikipedia - カートゥンKAT-TUN

References

2000s variety television series
2010s variety television series
Japanese variety television shows